2014 Alaska earthquake may refer to:

 2014 Aleutian Islands earthquake, on June 23
 2014 Palma Bay earthquake, on July 25